Ready to Die is the debut studio album by American rapper The Notorious B.I.G., released on September 13, 1994, by Bad Boy Records and Arista Records. The album features productions by Bad Boy founder Sean "Puffy" Combs, Easy Mo Bee, Chucky Thompson, DJ Premier, and Lord Finesse, among others. It was recorded from 1993 to 1994 at The Hit Factory and D&D Studios in New York City. The partly autobiographical album tells the story of the rapper's experiences as a young criminal, and was the only studio album released during his lifetime, as he was murdered sixteen days before the release of his second album Life After Death in 1997.

Ready to Die peaked at number 15 on the Billboard 200 and was subject to widespread critical acclaim and soon a commercial success. Three singles were released from the album: "Juicy", "Big Poppa", "One More Chance" and a promotional track of Biggie: "Warning". "Juicy", the lead single, peaked at number 27 on the Billboard Hot 100, number 14 on Hot R&B/Hip-Hop Singles & Tracks and reached number 3 on the Hot Rap Singles. "Big Poppa" was a hit on multiple charts, peaking at number six on the Billboard Hot 100 and also being nominated for a Grammy Award for Best Rap Solo Performance at the 1996 Grammy Awards. The Notorious B.I.G.'s lyrics on the album were generally praised by critics, with many praising his story-telling ability.

In April 2018, Ready to Die was certified 6× Platinum by the Recording Industry Association of America (RIAA). The album was significant for revitalizing the East Coast hip hop scene, amid West Coast hip hop's commercial dominance. It has been ranked by many critics as one of the greatest hip hop albums, as well as one of the greatest albums of all time. In 2020, the album was ranked 22nd on Rolling Stone updated list of the 500 Greatest Albums of All Time and was ranked 1st on their list of the 200 Greatest Hip-Hop Albums of All Time.

Background and recording
The album was recorded in New York City (mainly at The Hit Factory) in two stages during 1993 and 1994. In 1994, Biggie was 21 years old when he recorded the album. In 1992, Biggie was signed to the Uptown Records label by A&R Sean "Puffy" Combs. Biggie started recording his debut album in 1993 in New York, after making numerous guest appearances among his label-mates' singles around that time. The first tracks recorded include the album's darker, less radio-friendly content (including "Ready to Die," "Gimme the Loot" and "Things Done Changed"). In these sessions, XXL magazine describe an "inexperienced, higher-pitched" Biggie sounding "hungry and paranoid".

When executive producer Sean "Puffy" Combs was fired from Uptown, Biggie's career hung in limbo, as the album was only partially completed. After a brief period dealing drugs in North Carolina, Biggie returned to the studio the following year on Combs' new Bad Boy Records label possessing "a smoother, more confident vocal tone" and completed the album. In this stage, the more commercial-sounding tracks of the album were recorded, including the album's singles. Between the two stages, XXL writes that Biggie moved from writing his lyrics in notebooks to freestyling them from memory.

The album was released with a cover depicting an infant resembling the artist, though sporting an afro, which pertains to the album's concept of the artist's life from birth to his death. It has been listed as among the best album covers in hip hop.

Lawsuits and sample removal
On March 24, 2006, Bridgeport Music and Westbound Records won a federal lawsuit against Bad Boy Records for copyright infringement, with a jury deciding that Combs and Bad Boy had illegally used samples for the production of the songs "Ready to Die", "Machine Gun Funk", and "Gimme the Loot". The jury awarded $4.2 million in punitive and direct damages to the two plaintiffs, and federal judge Todd Campbell enacted an immediate sales ban on the album and tracks in question. On appeal, the Sixth Circuit found the damages unconstitutionally high and in violation of due process and remanded the case, at which point Campbell reduced them by $2.8 million; however, the verdict was upheld. All versions of the album released since the lawsuit are without the disputed samples.

Although a fair use issue, Combs and Bad Boy never raised the legal concept of the fair use doctrine in their defense. This decision was questioned by some legal experts: Anthony Falzone of the Fair Use Project at Stanford Law School criticized Combs and Bad Boy for not defending the legality of sampling and suggested that they might have refused to raise such a defense because they feared it could later imperil their control over their own music.

On April 2, 2014, Lee Hutson of The Impressions filed a multimillion-dollar copyright infringement suit against Combs, Bad Boy Records, and the estate of the late Notorious B.I.G. for copyright infringement, alleging that his song "Can't Say Enough About Mom" was illegally sampled in the production of the song "The What". The estate countersued in turn, claiming the sample as used was short, adapted, and supplemented, and thus subject to fair use, a legal tactic not pursued previously.

Composition

Production
The production on the album was mainly handled by Easy Mo Bee and The Hitmen. Cheo H. Coker of Rolling Stone depicted the beats as "heavy bottomed and slick, but B.I.G.'s rhymes are the showstoppers. The tracks only enhance them, whether it's the live bass driving a menacing undercurrent or [the] use of bluesy guitar and wah-wah feedback" and that the production is used to "push the rapper to new heights." The production is mainly sample-based with the samples varying from the percussion of funk tracks to the vocals of hip hop songs. Steve Huey presented some criticism over the beats, stating that the "deliberate beats do get a little samey, but it hardly matters: this is Biggie's show".

Lyrical themes
The Notorious B.I.G.'s lyrics on the album were generally praised by critics. Many critics applauded his story-telling ability such as AllMusic writer Steve Huey, who stated "His raps are easy to understand, but his skills are hardly lacking—he has a loose, easy flow and a talent for piling multiple rhymes on top of one another in quick succession". He also went on to mention that his lyrics are "firmly rooted in reality, but play like [a] scene from a movie". Touré, writing for The New York Times, referred to The Notorious B.I.G., proclaiming that he stood out from other rappers because "his lyrics mix autobiographical details about crime and violence with emotional honesty, telling how he felt while making a living as a drug dealer". The album is also noted for its dark tone and sinister sense of depression. In the original Rolling Stone review, Cheo H Coker declared that he "maintains a consistent level of tension by juxtaposing emotional highs and lows". "Things Done Changed" was also one of the few hip hop songs in The Norton Anthology of African American Literature.

The lyrics on Ready to Die tend to deal with violence, drug dealing, women, alcohol and marijuana use, and other elements of Notorious B.I.G.'s environment. He rapped about these topics in "clear, sparse terms, allowing the lyrics to hit the first time you hear them". The album contains a loose concept starting out with an intro that details his birth, his early childhood, his adolescence and his life at the point of the album's release. Songs on the album range from homicide narratives ("Warning") to braggadocios battle raps ("The What," "Unbelievable"). "Things Done Changed" deals with how life in the ghetto has changed since B.I.G.'s childhood. "One More Chance" as recited by B.I.G largely centers around the rapper's sexual prowess. "Juicy" is a "rags-to-riches chronicle". The title for "Big Poppa" is based on one of The Notorious B.I.G.'s many nicknames. The final song was "Suicidal Thoughts", a song where The Notorious B.I.G. contemplates and finally commits suicide.

Commercial performance
Ready to Die shipped 57,000 units in its first week of release. However, it was then certified Gold by the RIAA only two months after its release on November 15, 1994. on October 16, 1995, only a year and one month after its release the album was certified double Platinum. Ready to Die was then certified triple Platinum on August 26, 1998, and was later certified 4× Platinum by the RIAA on October 19, 1999. In April 2018, Ready to Die was certified 6 × Platinum by the Recording Industry Association of America (RIAA).

Singles

Three singles were released from the album: "Juicy", "Big Poppa", "One More Chance" and a promotional track of Biggie: "Warning". According to XXL the more commercial sound of the singles compared to the rest of the album was a result of encouragement by Combs during the later recording sessions in which they were recorded.

"Juicy" was released as the lead single on August 8, 1994. It peaked at number 27 on the Billboard Hot 100, number 14 on Hot R&B/Hip-Hop Singles & Tracks and reached number 3 on the Hot Rap Singles. It shipped 500,000 copies in the United States and the RIAA certified it Gold on November 16, 1994. Produced by Combs, it features a prominent sample of "Juicy Fruit" as performed by James Mtume. AllMusic's Steve Huey stated that, along with the other singles, it was an "upbeat, commercial moment", calling it a "rags-to-riches chronicle". Andrew Kameka, of HipHopDX, stated that the song was one of his "greatest and most-revealing songs" and went on to say it was a "Part-autobiography, part-declaration-of-success. It document[s] the star's transition from Brooklyn knucklehead to magazine cover story." Producer Pete Rock, who was commissioned to remix the track, alleged that Puffy stole the idea for the original song's beat after hearing it from him during a visit. Rock explained this in an interview with Wax Poetics:

"Big Poppa" was released as the second single on December 24, 1994, and like the previous single, it was a hit on multiple charts. It reached number six on the Billboard Hot 100, number four on the Hot R&B/Hip-Hop Singles & Tracks and number one on Hot Rap Singles. It sold over a million units and the RIAA certified it Platinum on May 23, 1995. Featuring production by Combs and Chucky Thompson of The Hitmen, it samples "Between the Sheets" by The Isley Brothers. The song was nominated at the 1996 Grammy Awards for Best Rap Solo Performance, but lost to Coolio's "Gangsta's Paradise". Steve Huey named it an "overweight-lover anthem".

"One More Chance" was released as the third single on June 9, 1995. The single was a remix of the album track. It was produced by Combs and featured a sample from DeBarge's "Stay With Me". It peaked at number two on the Billboard Hot 100 and reached number one on the Hot R&B/Hip-Hop Singles & Tracks and Hot Rap Singles. It sold over a million copies and the RIAA certified it Platinum on July 31, 1995. Steve Huey labeled it a "graphic sex rap". Rolling Stone writer Cheo H. Coker had a similar view of the song, noting that it was "one of the bawdiest sex raps since Kool G Rap's classic, "Talk Like Sex" and continued, stating it "proves hilarious simply because of B.I.G.'s Dolemitelike vulgarity."

Critical reception

Ready to Die received widespread critical acclaim from music critics. In his review for Rolling Stone, Cheo H. Coker stated "Ready to Die is the strongest solo rap debut since Ice Cube's AmeriKKKa's Most Wanted. From the breathtakingly visual moments of his birth to his Cobainesque end in 'Suicidal Thoughts,' B.I.G. proves a captivating listen. It's difficult to get him out of your head once you sample what he has to offer". Robert Christgau from The Village Voice commented "His sex raps are erotic, his jokes are funny, and his music makes the thug life sound scary rather than luxuriously laid back. When he considers suicide, I not only take him at his word, I actively hope he finds another way". The New York Times wrote "Though drug dealing carries tremendous heroic value with some young urban dwellers, he sacrifices the figure's romantic potential. His raps acknowledge both the excitement of drug dealing and the stress caused by the threat from other dealers, robbers, the police and parents, sometimes one's own. In presenting the downside of that life, Ready to Die offers perhaps the most balanced and honest portrait of the dealer's life of any in hip-hop".

Q magazine gave Ready to Die three out of five stars, and stated "the natural rapping, clever use of sound effects and acted dialogue, and concept element (from a baby being born at the start to the fading heartbeat at the end) set this well apart from the average gangsta bragging". In their original review for Ready to Die, The Source gave it four-and-a-half out of five 'mics', stating "Big weaves tales like a cinematographer, each song is like another scene in his lifestyle. Overall, this package is complete: ridiculous beats, harmonizing honeys, ill sound effects, criminal scenarios, and familiar hooks".

Legacy
Ready to Die has been highly acclaimed. In 1998, The Source included it on their 100 Best Rap Albums of All Time list, and in 2002, they re-rated it to the maximum five 'mics'. Rolling Stone has also given acclaim to Ready to Die over the years. In 2003, they ranked it number 133 on their 500 Greatest Albums of All Time list, 134 in a 2012 revised list, and 22 in a 2020 revised list. In 2004, they re-rated it to five stars. In 2011, Rolling Stone also placed it at number eight on their 100 Best Albums of the Nineties list, and described it as "mapping out the sound of 'Nineties cool'". Kilian Murphy from Stylus Magazine wrote favorably of the album in a retrospective review, and concluded "Sweet, hypocritical, sensitive, violent, depressed and jubilant; these words could all fittingly describe Big at various points on Ready to Die."

Steve Huey from AllMusic gave it five stars, stating "The album that reinvented East Coast rap for the gangsta age, Ready to Die made the Notorious B.I.G. a star. Today it's recognized as one of the greatest hardcore rap albums ever recorded, and that's mostly due to Biggie's skill as a storyteller". In 2006, Time magazine included it on their 100 Greatest Albums of All Time list, and stated "On Ready to Die, Wallace took his street corner experiences and filtered them through his considerable charm. The result was a record that mixed long stretches of menace with romance and lots of humor. No rapper ever made multi-syllabic rhymes sound as smooth". The album was also included in the book 1001 Albums You Must Hear Before You Die.

Accolades
The information regarding accolades is adapted from Acclaimedmusic.net,except where noted.
(*) signifies unordered lists

Track listing

Notes
 signifies a co-producer.
"Intro", "#!*@ Me (Interlude)", and "Friend of Mine" contain additional vocals from Lil' Kim.
"One More Chance" and "Juicy" contain additional vocals from Total. 
"Respect" contains backing vocals from Diana King.
"Me & My Bitch" contains additional vocals from Sybil Pennix.
"Who Shot Ya?" was originally included as a bonus track on the original double vinyl issue in 1994.
 A single-disc condensed LP edition was originally available at the time of release, and has been sometimes repressed. Side A features "Juicy," "Gimme The Loot," "Machine Gun Funk" and "Warning"; Side B features "Unbelievable," "The What," "Respect," "One More Chance" and "Big Poppa."

Sample credits

"Intro"
"Superfly" by Curtis Mayfield
"Rapper's Delight" by Sugarhill Gang
"Top Billin' by Audio Two
"Tha Shiznit" by Snoop Dogg

"Things Done Changed"
"California My Way" by The Main Ingredient
"Summer Breeze" by The Main Ingredient
"Vapors" by Biz Markie
"Lil Ghetto Boy" by Dr. Dre

"Gimme the Loot"
"Smokin' Cheeba-Cheeba" by Harlem Underground Band 
"Don’t Change Your Love" by The Five Stairsteps 
"Coldblooded" by James Brown
"Singing in the Morning" by The Ohio Players (Later removed following a lawsuit.)
"Throw Ya Gunz" by Onyx
"What They Hittin' Foe?" by Ice Cube
"Just to Get a Rep" by Gang Starr
"Scenario (Remix)" by A Tribe Called Quest

"Machine Gun Funk"
"Something Extra" by Black Heat
"Up for the Down Stroke" by The Horny Horns (Later removed following a lawsuit.)
"Chief Rocka" by Lords of the Underground

"Warning"
"Walk on By" by Isaac Hayes
"Thinking" by The Meters
"Freak of the Week" by Funkadelic

"Ready to Die"
"Hospital Prelude of Love Theme" by Willie Hutch
"Sing a Simple Song" by Sly and the Family Stone
"Yes, I'm Ready" by Barbara Mason
"Ain't No Half Steppin by Big Daddy Kane
"Two to the Head" by Kool G Rap & DJ Polo
"Check It Out" by Grand Puba
"Singing in the Morning" by Ohio Players (Later removed following a lawsuit.)

"One More Chance"
"Hydra" by Grover Washington, Jr.
"Stay With Me" by Debarge

"#!*@ Me (Interlude)"
"Feenin' by Jodeci

"The What"
"Can't Say Enough About Mom" by Leroy Hutson
"Overnight Sensation" by Avalanche

"Juicy"
"Juicy Fruit ('Fruity' Instrumental Mix)" by Mtume

"Everyday Struggle"
"Either Way" by Dave Grusin 
"Don't Change Your Love" by The Five Stairsteps

"Big Poppa"
"Between the Sheets" by The Isley Brothers
"Dolly My Baby (Bad Boy Extended Remix)" by Super Cat

"Respect"
"I Get Lifted" by KC & the Sunshine Band

"Friend of Mine"
"The Jam" by Graham Central Station
"Seventh Heaven" by Gwen Guthrie
"Vicious" by Black Mamba

"Unbelievable"
"Impeach the President" by The Honey Drippers
"Kitty With the Bent Frame" by Quincy Jones
"Your Body's Callin by R. Kelly

"Suicidal Thoughts"
"Lonely Fire" by Miles Davis
"Outside Love" by Brethren

"Who Shot Ya?"
"I'm Afraid the Masquerade is Over" by David Porter

"Just Playing (Dreams)"
"Blues and Pants" by James Brown
"Spinning Wheel" by Lonnie Smith

Personnel

 Notorious B.I.G. – writer, performer 
 Sean "Puffy" Combs – executive producer, additional vocals, producer 
 Mister Cee – associate executive producer
 Method Man – featured performer 
 Lil' Kim – additional vocals
 Total – additional vocals 
 Chucky Thompson – instruments, producer 
 Nashiem Myrick – additional programming, producer 
 Diana King – additional vocals 
 Sybil Pennix – additional voice 
 Easy Mo Bee – producer 
 The Bluez Brothers – producer 
 Jean "Poke" Oliver – producer 
 DJ Premier – producer 
 Lord Finesse – producer 
 Darnall Scott – producer 
 Rashad Smith – producer 
 Bob "Bassy" Brockman – recording, mixing
 Greg Pinto – recording, mixing
 Rich Travali – recording, mixing
 Mario Rodriquez – recording, mixing
 Charles "Prince" Alexander – recording, mixing
 Bill Esses –  recording, mixing
 John Wydrycs – recording
 Norty Cotto – recording
 Eddie Sancho – mixing
 Butch Bel Air – photography
 Gwendolyn Watts – A&R coordination

Charts

Weekly charts

Year-end charts

Certifications

See also
Album era
Bad Boy Records
East Coast hip hop
Golden age hip hop

References

External links
 Ready to Die at Discogs
 The Making of Ready to Die by XXL
 Next: The Notorious B.I.G. – By Vibe

The Notorious B.I.G. albums
1994 debut albums
Bad Boy Records albums
Arista Records albums
Albums produced by DJ Premier
Albums produced by Easy Mo Bee
Albums produced by Lord Finesse
Albums produced by Sean Combs
Albums produced by Trackmasters
Albums produced by Rashad Smith
East Coast hip hop albums
Hardcore hip hop albums
Concept albums